Michael Regan (1931 - 8 December 2018) was an Irish hurler who played for club sides Doneraile and New Ireland. He played for the Cork senior hurling team between 1955 and 1959, during which time he usually lined out as a right wing-forward.

Honours

Cork
Munster Senior Hurling Championship (1): 1956

Munster
Railway Cup (1): 1958

References

1931 births
2018 deaths
Munster inter-provincial hurlers